

F

F